Robert Griswold (born November 27, 1996) is an American swimmer.  He was a member of the 2016 and 2020 U.S. Paralympic Swimming Teams. He holds multiple American and world paralympic swimming records in freestyle, backstroke, butterfly, and individual medleys.  He competes in the Paralympic classes S8/SB7/SM8, and has cerebral palsy that affects coordination and strength. The United States Center for SafeSport temporarily suspended Griswold in 2020, reinstated him prior to the 2021 Paralympic Games, and then temporarily suspended him again in 2022, after he was accused of raping a fellow member of the US Paralympic Team at the 2021 Paralympic Games and thereafter; Griswold was later removed as a member of the US National Team.

Early life
Griswold was born in Hickory, North Carolina, lived in Freehold Borough, New Jersey, and now lives in Colorado Springs, Colorado. Raised in Freehold Township, New Jersey, he began swimming at the age of six at the Ocean County YMCA. He competed for his high school swimming team, and was team captain and MVP. Outside of athletics, he earned an Eagle Scout rank in the Scouts BSA program of the Boy Scouts of America, and organized a Paralympic Swimming Clinic to educate the community about disabilities and  available opportunities. He graduated from Freehold Township High School in 2015.

Collegiate swimming career 
Griswold competed for two NCAA Division II schools, Carson-Newman University in Tennessee (on a swimming scholarship, swimming for the Carson–Newman Eagles) and Fresno Pacific University in California (swimming for the Fresno Pacific Sunbirds) during his NCAA swimming career that began fall 2015. He graduated from Indiana State University, where he had competed for the Indiana State Sycamores in swimming, in 2020 with a bachelor's degree in communications. After college he began clerking at a law firm in St. Louis, Missouri.

International swimming career 
Griswold competed at his first international meet in 2014, and rose to prominence within the S8 classification initially gaining success in the distance freestyle events, winning his first world championships bronze in 2015.

He followed up his World Championships medals by qualifying for the Rio 2016 Paralympic Games and winning a bronze medal in the 100 m backstroke. He also placed fourth in the 200 m individual medley and fifth in the 400 m freestyle.

In 2016 began an era of dominance in the S8 100m backstroke, winning the event at the 2017 World Championships and 2019 World Championships. He carried his success into the 2020 Tokyo Paralympic Games by winning the gold medal by 4.27 seconds and breaking the world record.

At the 2017 World Championships he was the most decorated American male, with two gold medals and two silver medals and was honored by being chosen as the flagbearer at the opening ceremonies.

In addition to his gold medal in the 100m backstroke, Griswold won a gold medal in the 100m butterfly at the 2020 Tokyo Paralympic Games. He placed fourth in the 200 m individual medley and fifth in the 400 m freestyle.

At the 2022 World Para Swimming Championships, Griswold claimed his third consecutive title in the 100 m backstroke S8. He also claimed world titles in the 100 m butterfly and 200 m individual medley. Griswold won silver medals in the 100 m freestyle and the 4x100 freestyle relay 34pts and a bronze medal in the 400 m freestyle.

Sexual assault allegations and lawsuit 

In September 2020, the United States Center for SafeSport listed Griswold in its disciplinary database as having temporary restrictions for allegations of misconduct (which could cover a range of degrees of physical, emotional or sexual abuse). One month later, SafeSport confirmed that Griswold was eligible to compete at the Paralympic Games.

SafeSport's public disciplinary database indicated that Griswold was temporarily suspended on August 23, 2022, for allegations of misconduct in violation of the SafeSport Code, prohibiting him from practicing or competing at any event or facility under the U.S.O.P.C. or a national sports governing body while he was being investigated by SafeSport.

On October 20, 2022, SwimSwam detailed allegations of sexual assault against Griswold. He has been accused of repeatedly raping and sexually abusing Parker Egbert, a fellow member of the United States Paralympic Team, at the Paralympic Games and thereafter, including in the room that SafeSport allowed Griswold to share with the claimant at the Paralympic Games in 2021. Egbert, who is intellectually disabled and has autism, and has the mental capacity of a 5-year-old according to court filings, says that he was groomed by Griswold, and threatened with retaliation. 

Griswold was later removed as a member of the 2022 USA National Team.

Egbert filed a civil lawsuit on November 11, 2022, against Griswold, the U.S. Center for SafeSport (for negligence, claiming SafeSport failed to protect Egbert from Griswold, despite previous complaints of sexual assault by Griswold having been made to SafeSport in 2020), and the U.S. Olympic & Paralympic Committee in federal court in Colorado. The complaint alleged: "Remarkably, Defendant USOPC and Defendant U.S. Center for SafeSport ("SafeSport") allowed Griswold to supervise and share a bedroom with Plaintiff without any oversight, despite the fact that USOPC and SafeSport had received reports that Griswold was sexually assaulting other teammates," that "USOPC and SafeSport failed to inform Plaintiff's parents of the risks to their son due to his intimate and continuing proximity to Griswold, a known (or at the very least, suspected) sexual predator," and that "since its creation, SafeSport has faced significant scrutiny for its botched handling of abuse claims." According to the complaint, the accuser suffered injuries that required rectal surgery.

References

External links
 
 
 

1996 births
Living people
Paralympic swimmers of the United States
American male backstroke swimmers
American male butterfly swimmers
American male freestyle swimmers
Carson–Newman Eagles
College men's swimmers in the United States
Freehold Township High School alumni
Fresno Pacific University alumni
Indiana State Sycamores athletes
Medalists at the World Para Swimming Championships
Paralympic medalists in swimming
Paralympic gold medalists for the United States
Paralympic bronze medalists for the United States
People from Freehold Township, New Jersey
People from Hickory, North Carolina
Swimmers at the 2016 Summer Paralympics
Swimmers at the 2020 Summer Paralympics
Medalists at the 2016 Summer Paralympics
Medalists at the 2020 Summer Paralympics
People from Freehold Borough, New Jersey
Sportspeople from Colorado Springs, Colorado
Sportspeople from Monmouth County, New Jersey
Swimmers from New Jersey
Swimmers from North Carolina
S8-classified Paralympic swimmers
21st-century American people